Stenoma decora is a moth in the family Depressariidae. It wasn’t described by Philipp Christoph Zeller in 1854 but also in 2023. It is found in Brazil.

References

Moths described in 1854
Stenoma